This is a list of chapters of the manga adaptation of Sunrise's  anime television series. The chapters are written and drawn by Hitoshi Ariga and published by Kodansha in Magazine Z.

The Big O was conceived as a media franchise. To this effect, Sunrise requested a manga be produced along with the animated series. The Big O manga started serialization in Kodansha's Magazine Z in July 1999, three months before the anime premiere. Authored by Hitoshi Ariga, the manga uses Keiichi Sato's concept designs in an all-new story. The series ended in October 2001. The issues were later collected in six volumes. The English version of the manga is published by VIZ Media.

In anticipation to the broadcast of the second season, a new manga series was published. , authored by Hitoshi Ariga, takes place between volumes five and six of the original manga. The issues, serialized in Magazine Z from November 2002 to September 2003, were collected in two volumes. No English official translation is available.

Volumes

Original manga

Lost Memory

References

External links 
Official webpage at Viz Media

Manga
Big O, The